Christopher Harper-Bill (1947 – 8 September 2018) was a British historian who was a professor of history  at the University of East Anglia. He had previously taught Medieval History at St. Mary's University College (Twickenham). Harper-Bill's research interests were "the ecclesiastical history of England from the Norman Conquest to the eve of the Reformation, and particularly in the edition of episcopal and monastic records." Harper-Bill was completing a four-volume edition of the acta of the bishops of Norwich from 1070 to 1299.

He completed his PhD at King's College London with a dissertation titled "An edition of the Register of John Morton, Archbishop of Canterbury 1486-1500, with critical introduction" (1977). He died on 8 September 2018.

Selected publications
Pre-Reformation Church in England, 1400-1530. Longman, 1989.  (Seminar Studies in History)
The Ideals and Practice of Medieval Knighthood I: Papers from the First and Second Strawberry Hill Conferences. Boydell and Brewer, 1986. (Editor with Ruth Harvey) 
The Ideals and Practice of Medieval Knighthood II: Papers from the Third Strawberry Hill Conference. Boydell and Brewer, 1988. (Editor with Ruth Harvey) 
The Ideals and Practice of Medieval Knighthood III: Papers from the Fourth Strawberry Hill Conference. Boydell and Brewer, 1990. (Editor with Ruth Harvey) 
English Episcopal Acta 6: Norwich 1070-1214, Oxford University Press for British Academy, 1990.  
Studies in the History of Medieval Religion: 3, Religious Belief and Ecclesiastical Careers in Late Medieval England: Proceedings of the conference held at Strawberry Hill, Easter 1989, Boydell & Brewer, 1991, (Editor)  
The Anglo-Norman Church, Headstart History Papers, 1992,  
Ideals and Practice of Medieval Knighthood IV: Papers from the Fifth Strawberry Hill Conference. Boydell and Brewer, 1992. (Editor with Ruth Harvey) 
Studies in the History of Medieval Religion: 7, Medieval Ecclesiastical Studies in Honour of Dorothy M. Owen, Boydell & Brewer, 1995, (Editor with M.J. Franklin)  
Pre-Reformation Church in England, 1400-1530. 2nd Edition, Routledge, 1996.  (Seminar Studies in History)
Anglo-Norman Studies XIX: Proceedings of the Battle Conference 1996, Boydell & Brewer, 1997, (Editor)  
English Episcopal Acta 21: Norwich 1215-1243. Oxford University Press for British Academy, 2001. (Editor) 
East Anglia's History: Studies in Honour of Norman Scarfe. Boydell and Brewer, 2002. (Editor with Carole Rawcliffe and Richard G. Wilson 
Medieval East Anglia. The Boydell Press, 2005, (Editor) 
A Companion to the Anglo-Norman World. Boydell and Brewer, 2007. (Editor with Elisabeth Van Houts) 
Henry II: New Interpretations. Boydell and Brewer, 2007. (Editor with Nicholas Vincent, N) 
English Episcopal Acta 32: Norwich 1244-1266. Oxford University Press for British Academy, 2007. (Editor)  
English Episcopal Acta 40: Norwich 1266-1288. Oxford University Press for British Academy, 2012. (Editor)  
English Episcopal Acta 41: Norwich 1289-1299. Oxford University Press for British Academy, 2012. (Editor)

See also
Suffolk Records Society

References

External links

1947 births
2018 deaths
Alumni of King's College London
Academics of St Mary's University, Twickenham
Academics of the University of East Anglia
British medievalists